O Fantasma (English: The Phantom or The Ghost) is a 2000 Portuguese erotic drama film directed by João Pedro Rodrigues (in his feature directorial debut) and produced by the independent production company Rosa Filmes.

Premise
Young and handsome Sérgio works the night shift as a trash collector in Lisbon. He is uninterested in his pretty female co-worker Fatima, who displays an avid interest in him, so instead Sérgio roams the city. Eventually Sérgio becomes fascinated with a sleek motorcycle and its arrogant owner—a young man completely indifferent to Sérgio. Sérgio's surfacing desires unleash his darkest impulses, sending him down a dangerous path of violence, depravity, and degradation.

Cast
 Ricardo Meneses as Sérgio
 Beatriz Torcato as Fátima
 André Barbosa as João
 Eurico Vieira as Virgílio
 Jorge Almeida as police officer
 Joaquim Oliveira as Mário
 Florindo Lourenço as Matos
 Maria Paola Porru as João's mother

Reception
The film premiered at the Venice International Film Festival. It won the prize for Best Feature Film in the New York Lesbian & Gay Film Festival and the Entrevues Film Festival. Meneses was nominated for the 2001 Portuguese Golden Globe award for Best Leading Actor.

References

External links
 
 

2000 films
2000 directorial debut films
2000 drama films
2000 independent films
2000 LGBT-related films
2000s erotic drama films
Films directed by João Pedro Rodrigues
Films set in Lisbon
Films shot in Lisbon
Gay-related films
LGBT-related drama films
Portuguese drama films
Portuguese independent films
2000s Portuguese-language films
Portuguese LGBT-related films